Saif Khan was a favorite of Emperor Jahangir since he was a prince and chief of Sayyeds of Barha in Jahangir's time. Jahangir writes in his memoirs in the narration of his first regnal year "Sayyed Ali Asghar Bahra who has not a rival in bravery and zeal, is son of Sayyed Mahmud Khan Barha who was a great Amir of my father. This year I have bestowed on him the title of Saif Khan and thus distinguished him in equals and pears. He has never taken any intoxicating substance in his life. He is one of those few confidants who have been with me in hunting and other places". His rank was three thousands personal and two thousand and five hundred horse.

In 1014 Hijri Emperor Jahangir's son Khusro rebelled against the Emperor, Saif Khan was deputed to chase him with Sheikh Farid Bukhari, a battle took place near Lahore Saif Khan fought valiantly and got seventeen wounds.
In 1017 Hijri corresponding to 1609 CE Saif Khan was appointed to the Faujdariship of Hisar Firoza, this province as a Mughal tradition since Babur's time had been a fief of all Mughal crown princes.

Saif Khan administered  the province on behalf of crown prince Khurram. In 1610 CE he was granted the insignia (Alam).

In 1022 Hijri(1613 CE) he along with Crown prince Khurram later Emperor Shah Jahan was sent to chastise Rana Amar Singh of Udaipur, when the royal army encamped about 20 miles from Udaipur Rana Amar Singh took refuge in hills and his son came to the battlefield, Prince Khurram divided his army in four contingents and one contingent was put under Saif Khan's command. Prince of Udaipur sent his agent with a gift of sixty elephants for truce which was accepted. In 1614 on the occasion of Nauroz celebrations his rank was increased by 500 personal and 200 horses at the intercession of Prince Khurram. Next year in 1615 Saif Khan was honored with Kettle drums (Naqqarah) and his rank was increased by 300 horses thus fixing his rank to 3000 personal and 2000 horse.

In 1616 he was deputed  to accompany prince Khurram towards Deccan, Saif Khan died of cholera in Deccan during the campaign on May 24, 1616 CE. On hearing the news of his demise Emperor Jahangir remembered his services and condoled his sons Sayyed Bahadur Ali and Sayyed Diler Ali and gave them both suitable Mansab (rank) Jahangir mentioned the event of his death in his memoirs Tuzk-e-Jahangiri. A miniature portrait of him done by royal painter Nanha survived which is preserved in Metropolitan Museum of Art NY which they have published in a book entitled Emperor's Album.

References

1616 deaths
Mughal nobility
Year of birth unknown